Watford Museum is a local museum in Watford, Hertfordshire, in the United Kingdom. It is owned by Watford Borough Council and is located on the Lower High Street in Watford.

The museum opened in 1982 and is housed in a Grade II-listed Georgian town house which was previously the premises of Benskins Brewery. Its collection includes fine art, displays about local heritage, industry and sport, with a special collection related to the history of the Cassiobury Estate.

History
The mansion house at 194 Watford High Street was built for the Dyson family around 1775, although there are records of a brewery operating on the site since 1750. The three-storey, red-brick house, built in the Georgian neoclassical style, is fronted by a three-bay pediment with a central bull's eye window,
and flanked by two lower wings which were added circa 1807. Tall, yellow-brick Victorian brewing premises once stood behind the house, although these have since been demolished.

The house was bought in 1867 by Joseph Benskin and continued to operate as a brewery until it was acquired by Ind Coope in 1957. The mansion house was later converted into offices, and it was listed grade II by English Heritage in 1952. It became the site of the Watford Museum in 1982 and was officially opened on 14 March 1982 by the Watford-born actor and comedian, Terry Scott.

The museum celebrated its 30th anniversary in 2011.

Collections

The museum has a significant fine art collection, which includes the notable Cassiobury Collection. Works on display include artworks formerly of the Earl of Essex's collection at Cassiobury House, with paintings of the Cassiobury Estate such as A view of Cassiobury Park by John Wootton, View of the South-West Front of Cassiobury House by J. M. W. Turner, Cassiobury Park Gates by Charles Vickers and an 1831 painting of the Cassiobury House Winter Dining Room by William Henry Hunt. The museum also houses portraits of a number of Earls of Essex.

Among the other works of art on display are oil paintings of the Dutch and Flemish schools, with works by Adam François van der Meulen, Klaes Molenaer, Pieter Neeffs the Elder and Adriaen van Ostade, as well as paintings by Turner, Peter Lely, Ronald Pope and Joshua Reynolds. A number of acquisitions for the fine art collection have been assisted by grants from the Art Fund, including paintings by Henry Edridge, Sir Hubert von Herkomer, William Henry Hunt and John Wootton, and a set of 21 engravings from the Illustrations of the Book of Job by William Blake.

The museum's sculpture collection features works in works in bronze, copper and steel by Mary Bromet, Charles Browne, Charles Dyson-Smith, Jacob Epstein, Mario Negri, Ronald Pope and Takaaki.

Displays in the museum document the development of Watford Junction railway station, and a small gallery dedicated to the history of Watford Football Club includes sports memorabilia and a stage costume worn by Elton John.

The museum holds an archive collection of documents, printed ephemera, photographs and diaries related to Watford townsfolk, local government, nobility and businesses.

Around a third of the museum's collection is on display.

Location
The nearest railway station is  London Overground station; after 2017 this will also become a London Underground Metropolitan line station. The museum is within easy reach of the A41, the M1 motorway, and National Cycle Route 6.

References

External links
 Watford Museum – official site

Local museums in Hertfordshire
Watford
Museums established in 1981
1981 establishments in England
Art museums and galleries in Hertfordshire
Georgian architecture in England
Houses completed in 1775
History of Watford